Bryn Cader Faner is a Bronze Age round cairn which lies to the east of the small hamlet of Talsarnau in the Ardudwy area of Gwynedd in Wales. It is thought to date back to the late third millennium BC.
The site was disturbed by 19th-century treasure-seekers, who left a hole in the centre indicating the position of a cist or a grave. However, before the Second World War, the British army used the site for gunnery practice and damaged many of the stones on the east side.

Bryn Cader Faner is thought to mean 'the hill with the chair with the flag' or 'the hill of the throne with the flag'.

References

Megalithic monuments in Wales
Stone circles in Wales
Monuments and memorials in Gwynedd